Edward Michael Vera Perez Maceda (born October 3, 1970) is a Filipino lawyer and politician serving as the representative of Manila's 4th district since 2016. Prior to his election as congressman, he was councilor of the same district from 1995 to 2004 and from 2007 to 2016.

Early life and education
Maceda was born on October 3, 1970, the youngest of five sons of Ernesto Maceda and Maria Azucena, popularly known as Marichu Vera-Perez. He has four older brothers, Emmanuel, Ernesto Jr., Erwin and Edmond. His cousin, Pangasinan's 4th District Representative Christopher de Venecia, is the son of Marichu's sister Gina de Venecia.

He finished his grade school and high school at La Salle Greenhills. He went to university at University of the Philippines Diliman and finished the AB Journalism in the college of Mass Communication and went to Ateneo Law School where he finished his 4 years of Law. After that, he took the bar exam a year later and passed.

Political career

Manila councilor
As his brother and Councilor Ernesto Maceda Jr. had to continue his study in the United states, he ran for councilor in 1995 serving for three terms from 1995 to 2004. He ran again for councilor in 2007, serving for another three terms until 2016.

Representative from Manila
He ran in 2016 for the congressional race under Asenso Manileño and won with a total of 46,349 votes defeating Don Juan Bagatsing and Annie Bonoan.

On March 8, 2017, Maceda voted against House Bill 4727 which the bill that seeks the return of the death penalty, while his cousin Christopher de Venecia voted in favor of the bill. 

In 2019, he was re-elected in the same seat and won over his predecessor Trisha Bonoan-David and barangay kagawad Christopher Gabriel.

On July 10, 2020, he and his cousin Christopher de Venecia are one of the 11 representatives who voted to grant the franchise renewal of ABS-CBN. He is one of the two Manila Lawmakers to grant the franchise alongside Benny Abante.

On May 2022 elections, he ran for the congressional race for his third and last term under National People's Coalition (NPC) and won over Bonoan-David and Gabriel once again.

References

1970 births
Living people
Members of the House of Representatives of the Philippines from Manila
People from Manila
Pwersa ng Masang Pilipino politicians
Nationalist People's Coalition politicians
Manila City Council members
Metro Manila city and municipal councilors
University of the Philippines Diliman alumni